Cerithiopsis ara is a species of sea snail, a gastropod in the family Cerithiopsidae, which is known from the Caribbean Sea and the Gulf of Mexico. It was described by Dall and Bartsch in 1911.

Description 
The maximum recorded shell length is 3.2 mm.

Habitat 
Minimum recorded depth is 24 m. Maximum recorded depth is 55 m.

References

ara
Gastropods described in 1911